Lake Valencia, Peru is an oxbow lake formed by the Madre de Dios River in Peru's Madre de Dios Region. It is situated near the Bolivian border and its closest city is Puerto Maldonado.

See also
List of lakes in Peru

References
INEI, Compendio Estadistica 2007, page 26

Lakes of Madre de Dios Region
Lakes of Peru
Oxbow lakes